Virtus Pallacanestro Bologna, known for sponsorship reasons as Virtus Segafredo Bologna, is an Italian professional women's basketball club based in Bologna, Emilia-Romagna.

The club was founded in 2019, as the women's wing of Virtus Bologna, one of the most important men's basketball team in Europe. Virtus is owned by the coffee entrepreneur Massimo Zanetti.

History

2019–2021: Beginnings
In July 2019, the CEO of Virtus Bologna, Luca Baraldi, announced the opening of a women's basketball wing, to participate in the Serie A1 championship. In the same month, Alberto Piombo, a tax advisor, was appointed president of the women's wing. The 2019–20 season started with some troubles for Virtus, however, it was later cancelled due to COVID-19 pandemic.

In the 2020–21, Virtus signed among others Abby Bishop, Brooque Williams and Ana Marjia Begic, while it confirmed many players of the previous season, like the team captain, Elisabetta Tassinari. Moreover, the new head coach was Lorenzo Serventi. Virtus ended the regular season at the fourth place and was defeated in the national semi-finals by Reyer Venezia.

2021–present: Zandalasini era
On 20 May 2021, the club signed the 25 years old Cecilia Zandalasini, widely considered among the best Italian players of all time and 2017 WNBA Champion with the Minnesota Lynx. On the same day, president Zanetti announced Lino Lardo as the new head coach. Lardo, who already coached the Black V's men's wing during the early 2010s, is also the coach of Italy's women's national team. The roster was completed within a few days: on 24 May, Virtus signed also Sabrina Cinili, a point guard from Famila Schio, on 27 May Ivana Dojkić, a Croatian shooting guard from UKS Praha on 29 May Myisha Hines-Allen, a small forward from Lattes Montpellier who became WNBA Champion in 2019, and on 30 May Brianna Turner, a power forward from Adelaide Lightning.

Despite good premises, in November 2021 the team was eliminated in the group stage of the EuroCup. On 19 April 2022, during the national semi-finals against Reyer Venezia, Lino Lardo was fired and his assistant Angela Gianolla became the new head coach. The team ousted Reyer Venezia by 2–1 in the national semi-finals, reaching the finals for the first time in its history and qualifying for the EuroLeague Women. However, Virtus was defeated 3–1 by Famila Schio.

Season by season

Players

Current roster

References

External links
 Official website

Virtus
EuroLeague Women clubs
2019 establishments in Italy
Basketball teams established in 2019
Organisations based in Bologna
Sport in Bologna